"To Southey" or "To Robert Southey" was written by Samuel Taylor Coleridge and published in the 14 January 1795 Morning Chronicle as part of his Sonnets on Eminent Characters series. Robert Southey became a close friend of Coleridge during the summer of 1794 and the two originally formed a plan to start an ideal community together. Although the plan fell apart, Coleridge dedicated the poem to his friend and emphasized Southey's poetic abilities. Following the poem, Coleridge further drifted from Southey and the poem was not republished.

Background
Coleridge first met Southey when Coleridge was about to tour Wales during the summer of 1794. They shared similar political views and the two bonded immediately. Together, they established a plan to create a community run by the ideas of Pantisocracy, a system that would emphasize agriculture and communal living. To further attain this goal, they each married one of the Fricker sisters and started to make financial arrangements along with discussing with others that would join them. The two wrote many poems, with The Fall of Robespierre written by both, and they planned to sell the poems to help provide money. However, Coleridge left the side of his wife and travelled to London to further his poetic career.

On 1 December 1794, the Morning Chronicle began to run a series of Coleridge's poems called Sonnets on Eminent Characters or on "Eminent Contemporaries". In a 17 December 1794 letter from Coleridge to Southey, Coleridge copied a sonnet about Southey with a note that said, "I took the Liberty—Gracious God! pardon me for the aristocratic frigidity of that expression—I indulged my Feelings by sending this among my Contemporary Sonnets". The poem was printed for the 14 January 1795 Morning Chronicle, which ran it as the tenth poem of Coleridge's series under the name "To Robert Southey, of Baliol College, Oxford, Author of the 'Retrospect,' and Other Poems". It was the only time the poem was published.

Although Coleridge and Southey continued to spend time together and collaborate on their poetic efforts, their relationship was greatly strained and their ideas for the Pantisocratic government fell apart. The change in Coleridge's opinions on both Southey and William Godwin is reflected in Coleridge's not republishing the poems on either of them within his 1796 collection of poems. However, Coleridge also omitted the poems because he did not think they were any good.

Poem
The only edition of the poem reads:

Themes
The Sonnets on Eminent Characters contained many poems dedicated to those Coleridge considered his hero from many fields, with Southey ranking amongst them. Like the  poems in the series "To Godwin" and "To Bowles", "To Southey" talks about Coleridge's personal life and Southey's involvement in it. The heroes were divided into those who were artists, intellectuals, political figures, and military figures in a way similar to Milton. In particular, Milton's sonnet on Henry Lawes ("Sonnet 13") was the model for Coleridge's poem on Southey, along with the poem "To Bowles" and "To Mrs Siddons".

Like with Coleridge's feelings towards William Godwin after writing "To Godwin", Coleridge began to intellectually separate from Southey after "To Southey", and, during his lecture series in 1795, he began to stress Christianity as essential to his political beliefs. However, even within the poem, there is no direct reference to Southey's liberal political beliefs. Instead, the poem only discusses Southey as a poet. A side effect from not including the sonnet in the 1796 series is that Coleridge effectively removed the only sonnet about a contemporary poet from the series.

Notes

References
 Ashton, Rosemary. The Life of Samuel Taylor Coleridge. Oxford: Blackwell, 1997.
 
 Curran, Stuart. Poetic Form and British Romanticism. Oxford: Oxford University Press, 1986.
 Holmes, Richard. Coleridge: Early Visions, 1772-1804. New York: Pantheon, 1989.
 Joseph, T. and Francis, S. Encyclopaedia of World Great Poets. New Delhi: Anmol Publications, 2004.
 Mays, J. C. C. (editor). The Collected Works of Samuel Taylor Coleridge: Poetical Works I Vol I.I. Princeton: Princeton University Press, 2001.
 Speck, W. A. Robert Southey: Entire Man of Letters. New Haven: Yale University Press, 2006. 
 Trott, Nicola. "The Coleridge Circle and the 'Answer to Godwin'" in The Coleridge Connection. Eds. Thomas McFarland, Richard Gravil and Molly Lefebure. New York: St Martin's Press, 1990.

1795 poems
Sonnets on Eminent Characters
British poems
Works originally published in the Morning Chronicle